Valley Creek Presbyterian Church is a historic Presbyterian church in Valley Grande, Alabama, United States.  The two-story red brick church building was built in the Greek Revival-style from 1857–1859.  The sanctuary and a mezzanine level, formerly a slave gallery, are located on the upper floor.  It was added to the National Register of Historic Places on May 28, 1976, due to its architectural significance.

History
The Valley Creek Presbyterian congregation was established in 1816 by eight families from Mecklenburg County, North Carolina, making it the oldest Presbyterian congregation in Dallas County and one of the first established in what would become Alabama in 1819.  The founding family members were former congregants of the Rocky River Presbyterian Church, organized in 1751.  The Valley Creek Presbyterian congregation originally met in a wooden building, which was replaced by this brick structure.

References

External links
www.vcpresbyterian.com

National Register of Historic Places in Dallas County, Alabama
Churches completed in 1859
Churches on the National Register of Historic Places in Alabama
Presbyterian churches in Alabama
Religious organizations established in 1816
1816 establishments in Mississippi Territory